Khizri is a village/hamlet located in Chhachhrauli tehsil of Yamunanagar district in Haryana, India. It is 106.3 kilometers south-east of Chandigarh and 217 kilometers North of Delhi. According to 2009 statistics, Khizri is a gram panchayat of Khizri village. Population is 3351.

Geography 
Khizri has a total population of 2,317, spread among about 397 houses. 
The soil here is made of tertiary deposits from small streams of shiwaliks. Soil is sandy and less fertile than other parts of northern plains.
Common trees are Sheesham, Sal, khair and bargad. Thorny shrubs can also be found due to presence of sand brought down by streams of shiwalik .
Common crops here are Wheat, Rice, Mecca, Pulses, Sugarcane and Bajra. Plantation of Poplar and Safeda can also be found.

Notable people
The village is home to one of the biggest landlord family in Haryana. Chaudhary Abul Hasan (Zaildaar) was a renowned leader in northern Haryana. His son Chaudhary Abdul Rasheed was chairman of block for 25 years. His grandson Chaudhary Aslam Khan was a two time MLA (1987 & 1991). Chaudhary Akram Khan, son of Aslam Khan has been Minister of State for home and Deputy speaker of Haryana. The village sarpanch has been from their family forever until the seat got reserved for SC in 2015. The family still dominates the political lobby in Yamunanagar district and other parts of Northern Haryana.

References

Villages in Yamunanagar district